Tom Baxter (born Thomas Baxter Gleave, 29 October 1973) is an English singer-songwriter based in London. He was born in Ipswich, Suffolk, and grew up in Camborne Cornwall with his 4 siblings. 

The second son of Jeff and Julie Gleave (who were regulars on the folk music circuit in the late 1960s and early 1970s). Baxter and his siblings use their middle names as stage surnames.

Baxter is the middle brother of Jo Spencer (the eldest), and his younger brother  Charlie Winston, a successful songwriter based in France. The youngest sibling Vashti Anna was named after singer-songwriter Vashti Bunyan who is a family friend. 

By 15 Baxter had picked up the guitar and started a rockabilly band with his elder brother after hearing 'The Elvis Sun Sessions'. He went on to join Art school at 17 to specialize in Fine Art Painting. After moving to London at age 19 to attend music college to study a foundation course in Music & Performance at Brunel University and then later graduating with a BA in Commercial Music at Westminster University.

During this period he spent much of his time on the gig circuit and later  up a legendary series of successful residencies at Bush Hall in Shepherds Bush and The Bedford, Balham which brought him to the attention of the major record labels.

A self-titled EP was released by Sony Music through the Columbia Records label in May 2004 and included the tracks "Joanna", "Half a Man" and "My Declaration".

On the 30th July 2004, Baxter released on Columbia Records to critical acclaim his 10 track debut album, Feather and Stone, recorded at Peter Gabriel's Real World Studios. Following the release the album became a regular on the BBC Radio 2 playlist. Singles from the album included "This Boy" and "My Declaration". The album release was followed by a headlining UK tour and entered the Official UK Charts Top 75 Albums in August 2004. He also supported Nerina Pallot on her UK tour in January 2007. Prior to the album release Baxter was signed early on by Mike McCormack at Universal music publishing in 2003. After the release of Feather & Stone. Tom toured the UK & Ireland extensively off the back of a his Radio 2 success championed by Terry Wogan, Jonathon Ross and long time supporter Paul Kramer of the Hit Sheet. During this time he was managed by Matt Racher, Billy Mcleod, Matthew Austin. Baxter did many headline shows but also supported acts including, David Grey, Damien Rice, Kt Tunstall, Katie Melua, The Beautiful South. In 2004 Baxter performed live on the Jonathon Ross Show singing "This Boy" directed by Ben & Joe Dempsy 2004.      

In 2006, after parting ways with Sony. Baxter had the freedom, renewed confidence and artistic skills from his formative fine art training to pay for his next album by painting a large (3ft x 3ft) canvas for each of the ten 10 tracks on his next album ‘Skybound’.  Each print sold for £2000 with a hugely anticipated artwork sale at the former Richard Dennis Gallery in Notting Hill, London.  In an interview with the Daily Mail Baxter discusses how the musing of his artwork and music kept his perspective fresh and added more depth to his creativity. Now recognised not only as a gifted singer song-writer but a gifted painter, Baxter has been described as a multimedia role model.  Online guitar tutorials and an 80 page hardback book ’Tales from the Forest of Hope’ with stories and illustrated artwork followed also helped to raise funds for his music.      

On the 4th June 2007, Baxter released the critically acclaimed album Skybound under his independent label Sylvan. The 10 track album recorded independently in just 5 days at a recording studio in Chelsea, earning the praise of reaching the Top 20 charts and hailed as Album of the Week. Released on the revived Charisma Records label through a licensing deal with EMI after he split with Sony early in 2007. The first single, "Better", was released in January 2008 and was subsequently used on the soundtrack for the motion picture Run Fatboy Run. "Miracle" was used by the BBC to cover the final montage of their Olympics and Paralympics coverage. The second single was "Tell Her Today".  Baxter contributed the track "Make a Stand" to the Survival International charity album Songs for Survival in 2008. Later that year Boyzone covered and released "Better", reaching number 22 in the UK Singles Chart.

In 2009, "My Declaration" was covered by Eliza Bennett and used in the soundtrack the film Inkheart (Bennett also played the female lead, Meggie Folchart, in the movie). "Almost There" was covered by Dame Shirley Bassey as the opening track of her album The Performance. Baxter and the BBC Concert Orchestra accompanied Dame Shirley Bassey when she performed the song at the BBC Electric Proms on 24 October 2009 at the Roundhouse in London, a concert broadcast live on BBC Radio 2 and on BBC Two television the next day. The song was also used in the ending credits for the 2010 film, Trust.

Following Shirley Bassey's performance, Tom was invited to stay with Danny Hillis, the inventor, and his wife Patti. He brought along his long time friend Oli Langford and budding producer Jimi Lundi to set up a recording studio in their converted orange grove. Along with Wolfgang Aichholz, who acted as co-producer with Jimi Lundi, they moved to LA for six months to create an album. Despite taking a year to make, the album was never fully released, with only three songs making it onto the "Golden" EP.  Danny Hillis is speaking on the intro of "Dual" on the GOLDEN EP.  Baxter ended his relationship with his long time publisher, Universal Publishing. After taking a break from music, Baxter returned a few years later with two acoustic albums: "The Other Side Of Blue" (2016) and "Skybound" (2018).

In 2011, the song "Light Me Up" from Baxter's album Skybound was used as the chosen music to summarise the highlights of the ITV coverage of the marriage of Prince William and Kate Middleton. The song "Better" from the album Skybound was also used a few years later as highlights of the ITV coverage of the wedding of Prince Harry and Meghan Markle.

On 24 March 2017 Take That released on Polydor Records the album Wonderland. Baxter is credited as the songwriter for the track ''Hope'' along with Gary Barlow, Howard Donald and Mark Owen.

In 2021 Baxter was commissioned by ARTE France to score the music for a 4 part documentary series; ‘Wild Costa Rica, A Sanctuary of Biodiversity’ directed by Luis Miranda of Bamboo Productions and distributed by Off The Fence. The 4 part documentary series investigates the rich biodiversity of the country and discusses it's ongoing influence on the rest of the world by way of an incredibly environmentally progressive outlook. Since 2014, Costa Rica sourced 98% of its energy from renewable sources, has reforested large amounts of degraded land and utilises strong constitutional rights such as the human right to a healthy environment to increase sustainability. The series was an international broadcast produced by the European TV channel ARTE.TV requiring an emotional, modern music score that could appeal to the most significant number of people. 

Baxter performed at Night for Ukraine, a fundraising benefit held at the Roundhouse in north London on the evening of March 9, 2022, with the funds raised being donated to the Disasters Emergency Committee appeal, to provide aid to people fleeing Ukraine following the Russian invasion. The event was organized by Fabien Riggall in collaboration with the Ukrainian pop duo Bloom Twins.

Baxter is a co-composer with Magnus Fiennes for the upcoming sequel series of the British-French crime drama television series "Death in Paradise", titled "Beyond Paradise". The series is produced by Red Planet for BBC Worldwide, and is set to be released in March 2023.

Discography
The EP
"My Declaration"
"Joanna"
"Half A Man" [Live]

Feather & Stone 
"My Declaration"
"This Boy"
"Under The Thumb"
"Girl From The Hills"
"The Moon And Me"
"Day in Verona"
"All Comes True"
"Almost There"
"Don't Let Go"
"Scorpio Boy"

Skybound
"Night Like This"
"Skybound"
"Better"
"Tell Her Today"
"Miracle"
"Last Shot"
"Tragic"
"Half A Man"
"Icarus Wings"
"Light Me Up"

The Uncarved Block
"Boy Beneath The Stone"
"Hosanna"
"Lift Up My Wings"
"Sugarcane"
"Sail Away"
"Living"
"Arc Of Your Mallet"
"The Uncarved Block"
"String And Bow"
"Love Is Not Enough"
"Merry-Go-Round"

The Other Side Of Blue
"The Other Side Of Blue"	
"For Crying Out Loud"	
"The Ballad Of Davey Graham"	
"Black Are The Gypsy Horses"	
"Cold"	
"Hot Wax To A Stone"	
"Heroes & Monsters"	
"One Life"	
"Do You Know Me"	
"In Your Hands"	
"Lover"
"Where The Wild River Runs"

References

External links

 
 Profile on MySpace
 Tom Baxter's new promo video shot by a bunch of kids! 
 Tom Baxter interview at UKEvents.net

1973 births
Living people
musicians from Cornwall
musicians from Ipswich
English male singer-songwriters
21st-century English singers
21st-century British male singers